Kubert may refer to:

The Kubert School, Art schools in Dover, New Jersey

People with the name Kubert
Adam Kubert (born 1959), American comic book artist
Andy Kubert (born 1962), American comic book artist
Daniel Kubert (1947–2010), American mathematician 
Joe Kubert (1926–2012), American comic book artist
Kubert Leung, musician and Cantopop songwriter in Hong Kong